This page provides the summary of RBBC1 Western European Qualifier/Finals. 

Since 2012, Red Bull BC One has held a qualifier for the World Final in the Western European Region. The winner advances to the Red Bull BC One World Final.

Winners

2015

RBBC1 Western European 2015 results
Location: Madrid, Spain

2014

RBBC1 Western European 2014 results
Location: Helsinki, Finland

2013

RBBC1 Western European 2013 results
Location: Naples, Italy

2012

RBBC1 Western European 2012 results
Location: Rotterdam, Netherlands

2011

RBBC1 Western European 2011 results
Location: Barcelona, Spain

External links
 RBBC1 Western European Finals 2013

Red Bull BC One